The province of Nueva Vizcaya has 275 barangays comprising its 15 towns.

Barangays

References

Nueva Vizcaya
Populated places in Nueva Vizcaya